Moiré is a commune in the Rhône department in eastern France. It is around 10 km south west of Villefranche-sur-Saône, and around 25 km north west of Lyon.

See also
Communes of the Rhône department

References

Communes of Rhône (department)